Eduard Veith (30 March 1858, Neutitschein – 18 March 1925, Vienna) was an Austrian portrait painter and stage designer. Many of his works were influenced by Symbolism.

Biography 
He was born to the decorative painter, Julius Veith (1820–1887), and his wife Susanna, née Schleif (1827–1883). At first, he received training to follow in his father's profession. Later, he went to Vienna, where he took classes at the Museum of Applied Arts from Professor Ferdinand Laufberger. He capped off his studies by creating sgraffito for exhibition buildings at the Exposition Universelle in Paris. 

He then returned home, where he assisted his father with painting churches, synagogues and other ceremonial buildings.This was followed by several study trips; to Italy, Belgium and Tunisia. He finally settled in Vienna; becoming a free-lance artist and working mostly by commission. 

From 1890, he was a member of the Vienna Künstlerhaus. In 1896, he received a gold medal at the Große Berliner Kunstausstellung. In 1905, he was appointed a Professor at the University of Technology. In 1911, he married Bertha Griesbeck (1872–1952), from Augsburg. He later taught at the University of Applied Arts Museum of Applied Arts, and became a Professor there in 1920. During his years in Vienna, he maintained contact with his home town, and held exhibitions there.

In addition to his paintings, he did interior decorations for a number of the buildings on the Ringstraße, and trompe l'oeil stage sets. He often collaborated with the architects, Fellner & Helmer, who built dozens of theatres and opera houses throughout the Austro-Hungarian Empire. 

He died shortly before his sixty-seventh birthday, and was interred at Döbling Cemetery.

Selected paintings

References

Further reading 
 Silvia Freimann: Eduard Veith (1858–1925). (catalogue raisonné). Logos Verlag, 2011, 
 Robert Janás: "Eduard Veith – Útěk zimy", In: Brno v minulosti a dnes, #26. Brno 2013, pp.127 - 143 
 Marie Mžyková: Eduard Veith – Träume von Glück, Hess Verlag, 2013. 
 Sylva Dvořáčková, "Malíř Eduard Veith". In: Vlastivědný sborník okresu Nový Jičín. Vol.43. Nový Jičín 1989

External links 

 More works by Veith @ ArtNet
 
 Brief biography @ ND Moravskoslezské.

1858 births
1925 deaths
Austrian painters
Set designers
Decorative arts
Academic staff of the University of Applied Arts Vienna
People from Nový Jičín
Burials at Döbling Cemetery